Comhairle Fo-Thuinn (Irish for "Under-Wave Council"; CFT), also known as Irish Underwater Council (IUC)  and trading as Diving Ireland, is the national governing body for recreational diving and underwater sports in Ireland.

Organisation
CFT organises and promotes recreational scuba diving and snorkelling via a club system. It is administered by an executive committee is supported by the following four commissions: a Technical Commission which sets standards and tests for diving courses offered by its member clubs; a Medical Commission which advises on diving medical standards, treatment of diving medical conditions and monitors developments in hyperbaric medicine; a Sporting Commission which organises underwater sports, photography and an event known as the national gala; and a Scientific Commission which promotes underwater biology and archaeology.  Its membership consists of both clubs and individuals which as of 2004 respectively totalled 3,000 and 84. While the majority of its activities are in the Republic of Ireland, a small number of members and clubs are located in Northern Ireland. It is incorporated as a Guarantee Company Without Share Capital under the name 'Comhairle Fo-Thuinn – Irish Underwater Council'.

Recognition
CFT is recognised by the Irish Sports Council as the national governing body for recreational diving and underwater sports in the Republic of Ireland.
It is the Irish representative to Confédération Mondiale des Activités Subaquatiques with affiliations to the Sports, Technical and Scientific Committees.
It is also a member of CMAS Europe and the European Underwater Federation. CFT is both a supporter and a member of the National Steering Group of the Marine Conservation Society-co-ordinated Seasearch program which seeks to 'gather information on seabed habitats and associated marine wildlife in Britain and Ireland through the participation of volunteer recreational divers'.

Underwater sports
As of October 2013, underwater hockey is the only underwater sport supported by CFT with competition based in Dublin and Cork.

UWH Celtic Cup results

Qualifications
The CFT training program which is delivered by instructors based within its member clubs was structured as follows as of January 2013.

Snorkel grades
 Snorkel Skills One
 Snorkel Skills Two
 Snorkel Guide

Scuba Diver grades
 Diver 1 Star
 Diver 2 Star
 Rescue Diver
 Leading Diver 
 National Diver

Instructor grades
 Snorkel Instructor
 Instructor
 Examiner
 Leading Instructor
 National Instructor

Speciality grades
 Nitrox diver
 Diver First Responder(PHECC Cardiac First Responder)
 Diver Coxswain
 Advanced Nitrox Diver

Speciality grades
 Extended Range Diver
 Seasearch Diver
 Search & Recovery Diver
 Underwater Photographer Diver

CMAS equivalencies 
The following equivalencies were those in place as of January 2013.

EUF Certification
The CFT obtained CEN certification from the EUF certification body in 2006.

See also

References

External links
  CFT homepage
  Dive Ireland 2012 – International Dive Expo

Underwater sports
Underwater diving training organizations
1963 establishments in Ireland
Organizations established in 1963
Underwater hockey governing bodies
Water sports in Ireland
Diver organizations